Three Sisters Who Share an Eye is the third studio album by Burning Star Core, released on in June 2006 by No Fun Productions. Arthur magazine called it "essential listening from top to bottom" that "blows doors on everything around it."

Track listing

Personnel
Adapted from the Three Sisters Who Share an Eye liner notes.
 C. Spencer Yeh – electronics, voice
 The Wyvern – cover art

Release history

References

External links 
 Three Sisters Who Share an Eye at Discogs (list of releases)

2006 albums
Burning Star Core albums
Instrumental albums